Myriotrochus is a genus of sea cucumbers. The following species are recognised in the genus Myriotrochus:
 Myriotrochus ahearnae Pawson, Nizinski & Ames in Pawson et al., 2015
 Myriotrochus antarcticus Smirnov & Bardsley, 1997
 Myriotrochus bathybius Clark, 1920
 Myriotrochus clarki Gage & Billett, 1986
 Myriotrochus eurycyclus Heding, 1935
 Myriotrochus giganteus Clark, 1920
 Myriotrochus hesperides O'Loughlin & Manjón-Cabeza, 2009
 Myriotrochus longissimus Belyaev, 1970
 Myriotrochus macquoriensis Belyaev & Mironov, 1981
 Myriotrochus meteorensis Bohn, 2005
 Myriotrochus mitis Belyaev, 1970
 Myriotrochus mitsukurii Ohshima, 1915
 Myriotrochus neocaledonicus Smirnov, 1999
 Myriotrochus nikiae O'Loughlin & VandenSpiegel, 2010
 Myriotrochus rinkii Steenstrup, 1851
 Myriotrochus rotulus Smirnov, 1999
 †Myriotrochus smirnovi (Reich, 2002) 
 Myriotrochus theeli Östergren, 1905
 Myriotrochus vitreus (Sars M, 1866)

References

Holothuroidea genera
Extant Early Cretaceous first appearances
Myriotrochidae